Mohamed Benkablia (born February 2, 1993 in Oran) is an Algerian footballer who plays for NC Magra in the Algerian Ligue Professionnelle 1.

In June 2016, Benkablia signed a two-year contract with JS Kabylie.

References

External links
 
 

1993 births
Living people
Footballers from Oran
Algeria youth international footballers
2013 African U-20 Championship players
Footballers at the 2016 Summer Olympics
Olympic footballers of Algeria
Algerian footballers
Algerian Ligue Professionnelle 1 players
Algerian Ligue 2 players
ASM Oran players
JS Kabylie players
USM Alger players
CR Belouizdad players
ASO Chlef players
NC Magra players
Association football forwards
21st-century Algerian people